
The 1939 St. Louis smog was a severe smog episode that affected St. Louis, Missouri on November 28, 1939. Visibility was so limited that streetlights remained lit throughout the day and motorists needed their headlights to navigate city streets.

The problem of pollution control
Smoke pollution had been a problem in St. Louis for many decades prior to the event, due to the large-scale burning of bituminous (soft) coal to provide heat and power for homes, businesses and transport. In 1893, the Council passed an ordinance prohibiting the emission of "thick grey smoke within the corporate limits of St. Louis" but was unable to enforce it because of failed legal action taken against Heitzberg Packing and Provision Company, one of the worst corporate offenders. The effectiveness of laws was also limited by the lack of adequate inspection and enforcement. In 1933, the mayor, Bernard F. Dickmann, created a "citizen smoke committee" and appointed his personal secretary Raymond Tucker to take charge of efforts to improve air quality.

Early efforts had relied on education such as teaching people how to build cleaner fires – but this had almost no impact. It was soon realized that real improvement would only come about by switching to a cleaner fuel – gas, oil, coke, or anthracite were all considered but ruled out on cost grounds. The alternative was to wash and size the existing soft coal to make it burn hotter and cleaner, and ensure that all coal sold in St. Louis was of this variety. In February 1937 a smoke ordinance was passed creating a "Division of Smoke Regulation in the Department of Public Safety", forcing larger businesses to burn only clean coal and setting standards for smoke emission and inspection. By 1938 emissions from commercial smokestacks had been reduced by two-thirds.

Despite some improvement, smoke pollution was still a visible problem since the new law did not cover smaller businesses and domestic users – 97% of homes still used coal. The city council was reluctant to pass further legislation that might alienate voters so the mayor's "enforcer", Tucker, was limited to using persuasion through the press and radio broadcasts. One newspaper in particular, the St. Louis Post-Dispatch, became notable for its campaign to persuade residents of the benefits of switching to cleaner forms of coal.

The smog episode and its aftermath
However, on Tuesday, November 28, 1939, a meteorological temperature inversion trapped emissions from coal burning close to the ground, resulting in "the day the sun didn't shine". A cloud of thick black smoke enveloped St. Louis, far worse than any previously seen in the city. The day came to be known as "Black Tuesday". The smog hung about for nine days over the course of the following month. This proved to be the catalyst that forced the council's hand. New cleaner, affordable supplies of coal (semi-anthracite) were quickly secured from Arkansas in time for the next winter. This, together with a new smoke ordinance, improvements to the efficiency of furnaces and the ongoing public education campaign resulted in a significant and permanent improvement in air quality in the city.

See also
 Donora Smog of 1948
 1966 New York City smog
 Jewel Box (St. Louis, Missouri), a municipal greenhouse that was built because of high smog and soot levels
 2013 Eastern China smog
 1930 Meuse Valley fog
 Great Smog of London
 Pea soup fog

References

Further reading
 Tucker, Raymond R. Smoke prevention in St. Louis (Ind. Eng. Chem., 1941, 33 (7), pp 836–839)
 Earthways Center. In the Air: In a shroud of smoke, Student Booklet 3-6.

External links
 History of Pollution problems.
 Anti-Smoke Campaign.

Smog events
1939
St Louis Smog, 1939
Air pollution in the United States
1939 in the environment
saint louis